The Prime Minister's Science Prizes are awarded yearly by the Prime Minister of New Zealand. They were first awarded in 2009 in order to raise the profile and prestige of science among New Zealanders. The 2019 awards were presented in early 2020.

Awards

The Prime Minister's Science Prize 
Awarded to an individual or a team, the prize recognises a scientific discovery or achievement that has a significant economic, health, social or environmental impact on New Zealand or internationally in the past five years. The total prize is NZD 500,000.

Prizewinners 

 2021: The Neonatal Glucose Studies Team, led by Jane Harding
 2020: 24 research scientists doing COVID-19 modelling at Te Pūna Matatini
2019: Antarctic sea rise research by scientists at Victoria University, Niwa and GNS Science
 2018: STRmix team of 16 software developers from Institute of Environmental Science and Research.
 2017: Plant & Food Research Psa response team.
 2016: The Dunedin Study led by Richie Poulton.
 2015: Bone and Joint Research Group, led by Mark Bolland, Andrew Grey and Ian Reid.
 2014: He Kainga Oranga/Housing and Health Research Programme led by Professor Philippa Howden-Chapman.
 2013: John Boys and Grant Covic at the University of Auckland.
 2012: Paul Moughan and Harjinder Singh at Massey University.
 2011: NIWA – Otago University Chemical and Physical Oceanography team led by Philip Boyd.
 2010: Magnetic Resonance Innovation team led by Paul Callaghan.
 2009: Bob Buckley and Jeff Tallon of Industrial Research Ltd.

The Prime Minister's MacDiarmid Emerging Scientist Prize 
The prize is awarded to an outstanding emerging scientist who has had their PhD conferred within the last eight years. Prior to 2015 the qualifying period was within five years of conferment. The recipient receives NZD 200,000. This award was preceded by Young Scientist of the Year sponsored by the MacDaimird Institute.

Prizewinners 

 2021: Jemma Geoghegan from the University of Otago
 2020: Chris Cornwall from Victoria University of Wellington
2019: Miro Erkintalo from the University of Auckland
 2018: Peng Du from the University of Auckland.
 2017: Carla Meledandri from the University of Otago.
 2016: Brendon Bradley at the University of Canterbury.
 2015: Alex Taylor at the University of Auckland.
 2014: Karl Iremonger at the University of Otago.
 2013: Benjamin O’Brien of StretchSense Ltd.
 2012: James Russell at the University of Auckland.
 2011: Rob McKay at Victoria University of Wellington.
 2010: Donna Rose Addis at the University of Auckland.
 2009: John Watt at Victoria University of Wellington.

The Prime Minister's Science Teacher Prize 
Awarded to a teacher who is teaching science to school-age children, the prize is NZD 150,000.

Prizewinners 

 2021: Bianca Woyak, from Burnside Primary School in Christchurch
 2020: Sarah Washbrooke from Remarkables Primary School, Queenstown
 2019: Michelle Dalrymple from Cashmere High School
 2017: Sarah Johns from Nelson College for Girls.
 2016: Diana Christenson from Koraunui School, Lower Hutt.
 2015: Tania Lineham, Head of Science at James Hargest College, Invercargill.
 2014: Terry Burrell, Learning Area Leader of Science at Onslow College, Wellington.
 2013: Fenella Colyer of Manurewa High School in Auckland.
 2012: Peter Stewart, Papatoetoe High School, Auckland.
 2011: Angela Sharples, Rotorua Boys’ High School.
 2010: Steve Martin from Howick College in Auckland.
 2009: Paul Lowe at Morrinsville College in Waikato.

The Prime Minister's Future Scientist Prize 
Awarded to a Year 12 or Year 13 student who has undertaken a science, mathematics, technological or engineering project, the prize is worth NZD 50,000.

Prizewinners 

 2021: Carol Khor Shun Ting from Burnside High School, Christchurch
 2020: James Zingel from Bethlehem College, Tauranga
2019: Thomas James from Burnside High School
 2018: Finnegan Messerli from Onslow College, Wellington.
 2017: Jonathan Chan, Auckland Grammar School.
 2016: Catherine Pot from Onslow College, Wellington.
 2015: Georgia Lala from Diocesan School for Girls, Auckland.
 2014: Tim Logan from Darfield High School, Canterbury.
 2013: Thomas Morgan at Marlborough Boys’ College in Blenheim.
 2012: Hannah Ng, St Cuthbert’s College, Auckland.
 2011: Nuan-Ting Huang, Diocesan School for Girls, Auckland.
 2010: Bailey Lovett at James Hargest College, Invercargill.
 2009: Stanley Roache, Onslow College, Wellington.

The Prime Minister's Science Communication Prize 
The Prize is awarded to either a practising science with an interest, passion and aptitude for science communication, or to a person with expertise in communicating complex scientific or technological information to the public. The prize was worth NZD 100,000. In 2021 the prize was worth $75,000.

Prizewinners 

 2021: Toby Morris, cartoonist, the Spinoff
 2020: Michael Baker, University of Otago
2019: Rangi Matamua, University of Waikato
 2018: James Renwick (climate scientist), Victoria University of Wellington
 2017: Damian Christie, SciFilms.
 2016: Rebecca Priestley from Victoria University of Wellington.
 2015: Ian Griffin at the Otago Museum.
 2014: Michelle Dickinson, 'Nanogirl', at the University of Auckland.
 2013: Siouxsie Wiles, University of Auckland.
 2012: Shaun Hendy, Victoria University of Wellington and Industrial Research Ltd.
 2011: Mark Quigley, University of Canterbury.
 2010: Cornel de Ronde at GNS Science.
 2009: Elizabeth Connor, Wellington.

References

External links 
 Official website
 Recipient list

New Zealand awards
2009 establishments in New Zealand
Science and technology in New Zealand